The 2021–22 Sheikh Russel KC season was the 14th competitive and 27th overall season in top-flight football since club established in 1995. The season covered the period from 1 October 2021 to 2 August 2022.

Season overview

June
On 21 June 2021 Sheikh Russell KC football committee re-elected Sayem Sobhan Anvir as a club chairman. He indicated that the club will play for upcoming season for the trophy and they will buy some star foreign players.

November
On 27 November Sheikh Russel KC defeated Uttar Baridhara SC by 1–0 in their inaugural match of the season. Winning scorers of the match Mannaf Rabbi who found the net on 58 minutes and left the field ensured victory.

December
On 1 December Sheikh Russel KC played second game of their group against Bangladesh Air Force Football Team and they have defeated by 2–0 goals. Ailton Machado two goals secured their comfortable win.

On 5 December Sheikh Russel KC have draw 1–1 goals versus Sheikh Jamal DC. On 26 minutes Sheikh Jamal DC defender Sahin Mia goal took lead but they couldn't hold it for long on 28 minutes Guinean forward Esmaël Gonçalves equalized scored.

On 12 December Sheikh Russel KC defeated by 0–1 goals against Bangladesh Police FC. 4 minutes of first half goal by Afghan forward Amredin Sharifi took lead Bangladesh Police FC. In the 41 minutes referee Md Mizanur Rahman showed red card to Monaem Khan Razu & they finished first with 10 mens squad. In the half on 59 minutes Hemanta Vincent Biswas charged red card and they ended full time 9 players team. Sheikh Russel KC eliminated from the competition.

On 27 December Sheikh Russel KC won 3–0 goals against Uttar Baridhara Club by FIFA Walkover laws. The match scheduled to play following date but the opposition club withdrew their name from the tournament. The match commissioner declared Sheikh Russel KC winner of the match with full 3 point.

On 29 December Sheikh Russel KC draw 2–2 goals against Dhaka Abahani. In the First half on 8 minutes goal by Dorielton took lead Dhaka Abahani but after 12 minutes Mannaf Rabbi level the score for Sheikh Russel KC. In the second half again Dhaka Abahani took lead on 61 minutes second goal of Dorielton. In the 84 minutes Ailton Machado goal level the score 2–2 and end the match with draw. But due to withdrawn Uttar Baridhara Club participation in the tournament both teams' points were equal and referee were used penalties shoot out to decided group champion which Sheikh Russel KC won 13–12.

January
On 3 January Sheikh Russel KC lost 3–4 goals versus Rahmatganj MFS. In the first half Rahmatganj MFS Philip Adjah two goals on 28, 45 minutes finished first half with score 2–0. In the second half fought back Sheikh Russel KC Thiago Amaral score on 63 minutes made scored  2–1. In the 82 minutes Aizar Akmatov penalty goal and Ailton Machado on 84 minutes made the score 3–2. In the 89 minutes Rahmatganj Nigerian Sunday Chizoba level the scoreline 3–3. In the extra time on 118 minutes goal by Khondoker Ashraful Islam secured Rahmatganj MFS Semi-finals race.

February
On 5 February Sheikh Russel KC drew 1–1 goals against Dhaka Mohammedan in the away match. On 24 minutes a Souleyman Diabate goal took lead Dhaka Mohammedan. Md Saad Uddin was shown a red card on 24 minutes due to bad foul. Sheikh Russel KC finished first half with 0–1 goal. In the second half on 67 minutes Md Masud Rana Dhaka Mohammedan was shown red and sent him off and both teams played ten men squads. On 84 minutes a Aizar Akmatov goal levelled the score 1–1 goals Sheikh Russel KC.

On 9 February  Sheikh Russel KC has drawn 1–1 goals against Chittagong Abahani in their home match. In the first half on 20 minutes a goal by Mohammad Jewel took lead 1–0 goal but Chittagong Abahani Peter Ebimobowei goal on 33 minutes leveled the score 1–1 goals until finished halftime. In the second half both players playing defensive football but no one has any score until the match got over 1–1 drew.

On 13 February Sheikh Russel KC won by 1–0 goal in away game against Saif Sporting Club.
 In the first half on 39 minutes a penalty goal by defender Aizar Akmatov took lead and finished half time. In the second half Sheikh Russel KC tried to extended the lead but Saif Sports Club also tried to equalized score but they won't able to do it. Sheikh Russel KC have left the field with full three  points.

On 18 February Sheikh Russel KC defeated 3–1 goals to Dhaka Abahani at home match. In the first halftime both teams has played goalless. In the second half on 49 minutes Jewel Rana open account for Dhaka Abahani and second goals on 61 minutes by Milad Sheykh Soleimani made score 2–0. On 64 minutes goal by Esmaël Gonçalves made score 2–1 and Nabib Newaj Jibon goal on 84 minutes Dhaka Abahani secured win the game.

On 23 February Sheikh Russel KC lost to Sheikh Jamal DC by 0–1 goal in the away ground. In the first half on 33 minutes Nigerian forward Matthew Chinedu goal took lead and finished halftime with 1–0 lead. In the second half both teama play goalless and Sheikh Jamal DC secured win with 3 points.

On 28 February Sheikh Russel KC lost to 0–1 goal against Bashundhara Kings in the home match. In the first half both teams has play competitive football and they have finished 0–0 score first half of the match. In the second part of the match on 83 minutes a penalty goal by Brazilian star Robson goal gave victory for Bashundhara Kings by 1–0.

March
On 6 March Sheikh Russel KC lost by 3–2 goals against Uttar Baridhara Club in the away game. On 7 minutes Aizar Akmatov and on 11 minutes goals by Esmaël Gonçalves 
took early 2–0 lead Sheikh Russel KC. On 39 minutes Saiddoston Fozilov and after a minutes goal by Sujon Biswas equalized score 2–2 goals before called for halftime break. In the second half additional time 90+3 minutes Sujon Biswas secured victory for Uttar Baridhara Club by 3–2 goals.

On 12 March Sheikh Russel KC lost by 0–3 goals versus Muktijoddha Sangsad KC at home ground. In the first half on 22 minutes Muktijoddha Sangsad KC Japanese forward Soma Otani introduced first goal for Muktijoddha Sangsad KC and they have finished halftime. In the second half on 54 minutes Didarul Alam goals make scoreline 2–0. On 81 minutes Aminur Rahman Sajib goals thrashed Sheikh Russel KC by 3–0 goals and Muktijoddha Sangsad KC got three points.

On 18 March Sheikh Russel KC have drew against Bangladesh Police FC by 1–1 goals in the away match.

April
On 4 April Sheikh Russel KC drew against Rahmatganj MFS by 1–1 goals at home. On 4 minutes goal by a goal by Nigerian forward Sunday Chizoba Rahmatganj MFS took early lead but between one minutes goal by Mohammad Jewel Sheikh Russel KC equalized score 1–1 and they have finished first halftime. In the second 45 minutes both teams play goalless until end the game.

On 9 April Sheikh Russel KC defeated Swadhinata KS by 2–1 goals at home ground. On 13 Minutes defender Manik Hossain Molla and on 20 minutes penalty goal by Tajikistan defender Aizar Akmatov goal took lead by 2–0 score and finished first halftime. In the second halftime before referee added extra both teams were not found net but on 90+3 minutes a goal by Uzbekistan defender Nodir Mavlonov Swadhinata KS reduced score to 2–1.

On 13 April Sheikh Russel KC has signed with Nigerian forward Ismahil Akinade and Ivory Coastian midfielder Didier Brossou to join rest of the season matches.

On 29 April Sheikh Russel KC have won by 2–1 goals versus Chittagong Abahani in the away game.

May
On 7 May Sheikh Russel KC have lost by 0–1 goal against Saif Sporting Club at home ground.

On 12 May Sheikh Russel KC have drew against Dhaka Abahani by 1–1 in the away game.

June
On 21 June Sheikh Russel KC have won versus Sheikh Jamal DC by 3–1 goals at home game.

On 26 June Sheikh Russel KC have defeated against table topper Bashundhara Kings by 2–3 goals in the away match.

July
On 3 July Sheikh Russel KC have won by 5–3 goals against Uttar Baridhara Club at home game.

On 15 July Sheikh Russel KC have drawn with score 0–0 in the away  match against Muktijoddha Sangsad KC.

On 21 July Sheikh Russel KC have beat Bangladesh Police FC by 4–1 goals at home venue.

On 27 July Sheikh Russel KC have won 3–2 goals versus Rahmatganj MFS in the away ground.

August
On 2 August Sheikh Russel KC have won by 4–1 goals against Swadhinata KS in the away match.

Current squad
Sheikh Russel KC squad for 2021–22 season.

Transfer

In

Out

Released

Competitions

Overall

Overview

Federation Cup

Group stages

Group B

Knockout stage

Independence Cup

Group stages

Group B

Knockout stage

Premier League

League table

Results summary

Results by round

Matches

Statistics

Goalscorers

Source: Matches

References

Sheikh Russel KC
1995 establishments in Bangladesh
Bangladeshi football club records and statistics
Sport in Dhaka
2021 in Bangladeshi football
2022 in Bangladeshi football